Robert Service High School is a public high school in Anchorage, Alaska. It had an enrollment of 1,779 students as of August 2, 2016. Serving grades 9 through 12, the school was named for the poet Robert W. Service. Part of the Anchorage School District, the school opened in 1971 and was the last of four high schools built by the district (its lineal predecessor, the Anchorage Independent School District) within a decade. Service High originally operated as Service-Hanshew; as was the case common within Anchorage during that time, junior and senior high schools shared a single building. Included in the case with other junior-senior high schools in Anchorage, a separate structure was built to educate the junior student body and referred as Hanshew Middle School in the period of the 1980s oil glut. This is located approximately two miles west of Service along the Lake Otis Parkway. The school completed a partial renovation in 2005. The official school colors are green and gold, and its mascot is the cougar. Service High School's current principal is Allen Wardlaw.

Demographics
The ethnic and gender demographics for Service High School during the 2013-14 year were the following:

A total of 34% of the school was categorized as economically disadvantaged as measured by the number of students who qualified for a free or reduced price lunch.

Accreditation
Service High School is accredited by the Northwest Association of Schools and Colleges and participates in sports and extramural activities sponsored by the Alaska School Activities Association.

Notable alumni 
 Tommy Beaudreau, attorney and former official in the United States Department of the Interior
 Emma Broyles, Miss America 2022
 Thomas A. Birkland, professor of public policy at North Carolina State University
Matthew Burtner, musician, composer, and inventor of the metasaxophone (1988 graduate)
 Brandon Dubinsky, NHL forward, New York Rangers (2004 graduate)
 Anna Fairclough, member of the Alaska Senate from Eagle River (1976 graduate)
 Tyler Kornfield (born 1991), Olympic cross-country skier (2009 graduate)
 Larry Sanger, Wikipedia co-founder (1986 graduate)
 Mark Schlereth, NFL guard and ESPN analyst (1984 graduate)
 Jeremy Teela, 2002, 2006, 2010 US Olympian, Biathlon (1995 graduate)
 Cathy Tilton, member of the Alaska House of Representatives from Wasilla (class of 1980)

References

External links
 
 Freshman Academy
 The Seminar School
 Biomedical Career Academy
 Leadership Academy

1971 establishments in Alaska
Anchorage School District
Educational institutions established in 1971
High schools in Anchorage, Alaska
Public high schools in Alaska